Canidia canescens is a species of longhorn beetles of the subfamily Lamiinae. It was described by Dillon in 1955, and is known from western Mexico.

References

Beetles described in 1955
Acanthocinini